Por Fuera y Por Dentro is the first album released by Colombian singer/composer Carlos Vives. Its release date was June 6, 1986. Vives was best known as the star of television soap operas at the time of its release. The album contains romantic ballads with heavy use of synthesizers, and precedes the era before Vives started singing vallenato, the genre that he has been associated with for the most part of his career. As it was the case with his next early albums, this was not a commercial success, and it's his least known record. Largely ignored by the public, the album is a collector's item for fans, and is a difficult find.

Description 

Carlos Vives, one of the greatest artists of Latin America and that revolutionized the modern vallenato, began as a young man struggling in the Latin television star. With soap operas, to be a springboard for Latin American in search of fame, Vives was no exception . In his native Colombia, especially in Santa Marta where he grew up and in Bogota where he studied and raised to be an actor and started his career in a series of shows like " Little Giants " 1983 and "Yours is My Heart " 1985 and before seeking notoriety in the title role of "Gallito Ramirez " in 1986 . That same year, he released his first album Outside and inside, marking the life of Vives and his true passion, music, this album contains songs by Fernando Garavito and other Colombian composers.
Before the release of their first album tells the inside cover this argument Vives said, was the following:

Translated into English, reads:

Track listing

Album credits
Performance Credits
Carlos Vives - Vocals
Joseph Max Klitfus - Piano & Synthesizer
Gabriel Rondón - Acoustic Guitar
Alfonso Rondón - Bass
Hernando "Henry" Becerra - Electric Guitar
Wilson Viveros - Drums and percussion
Eduardo Maya - Trumpet
Dagoberto García - Clarinet & Saxophone
Gustavo "El Pantera" García - Trumbone
Lizandro Zapata - Choir
Claudia Altamar - Choir
Carlos Ortiz - Choir
Alexa Hernández - Choir
Luis Fernando Ardila - Choir
Tony Navia - Choir
Yanet Waldman (Joel) - Choir
Guillermo Vives - Choir
El Chato and Los Pequeños Gigantes - Choir
Technical Credits
Joseph Max Klitfus - Arranger
Fernando Garavito - Direction
Ricardo Acosta - Production
Carlos Vives - Executive Producer
Adolfo "El Mono" Levi - Engineer
Carlos Vives - Design
Dora Franco - Photography
John Jairo - Makeup
Fotoletras - Graphics
Nelson Robayo - Illustrations
Recorded in "The Studio" during May 1986

Carlos Vives albums
1986 debut albums